The Ottawa Jazz Festival is an annual music festival located in Ottawa, Canada.

Lineups

2019
2019 event was held from June 21 to July 1 in Marion Dewar Plaza due to the Confederation Park's renovation.

2020
It was cancelled due to COVID-19 pandemic. A series called Tenacity, was streamed internationally.

2021
In 2021, the festival was held from August 19 to 22. It was a mix festival with live and virtual performances because of the COVID-19 pandemic restrictions.

2022
2022 event will be held from June 24 to July 3 at Confederation Park. The festival would be returning after the park's renovation and the COVID-19 breaks.

References

External links
 Ottawa Jazz Festival official website
  "Ottawa Citizen - Ottawa Jazz Festival a Wild Few Days of Music and All That Jazz"
  "Exclaim! Review - Tanya Tagaq - TD Ottawa Jazz Festival - June 28, 2018"
  "Narcity - 30 things to do in Ottawa that you have to add to your winter bucket list"
  "CBC All in a Day Segment with Alan Neal"
  "Ottawa Citizen - Jazz Festival Review - Brian Wilson Takes Audience Back in Time on 50th Birthday of Pet Sounds Album"
  "Ottawa Jazz Festival announces Main Stage lineup for 2013: music of every style"
  "Ottawa Jazz Festival 2013 lineup: what's on"
  "Remembering Jacques Emond's life-long love of jazz"
  "Jazzfest 2012: Younger and a bit jazzier but definitely covered (an analysis)"
  "Controversy over non-jazz acts reaches Ottawa Jazz Festival Annual Meeting"

Music festivals in Ottawa
Jazz festivals in Canada
Recurring events established in 1980
Annual events in Ottawa